The Birch–Tate conjecture is a conjecture in mathematics (more specifically in algebraic K-theory) proposed by both Bryan John Birch and John Tate.

Statement
In algebraic K-theory, the group K2 is defined as the center of the Steinberg group of the ring of integers of a number field F. K2 is also known as the tame kernel of F. The Birch–Tate conjecture relates the order of this group (its number of elements) to the value of the Dedekind zeta function . More specifically, let F be a totally real number field and let N be the largest natural number such that the extension of F by the Nth root of unity has an elementary abelian 2-group as its Galois group. Then the conjecture states that

Status
Progress on this conjecture has been made as a consequence of work on Iwasawa theory, and in particular of the proofs given for the so-called "main conjecture of Iwasawa theory."

References
 J. T. Tate, Symbols in Arithmetic, Actes, Congrès Intern. Math., Nice, 1970, Tome 1, Gauthier–Villars(1971), 201–211

External links

Conjectures
K-theory
Unsolved problems in mathematics